The Indonesia Arena is a multipurpose indoor arena currently under construction at the Gelora Bung Karno Sports Complex in Jakarta, Indonesia. Set to open in June 2023, it is proposed to have a maximum seating capacity of 16,500. It is one of the venues of the 2023 FIBA Basketball World Cup.

Construction
Indonesia was appointed as co-hosts along with the Philippines and Japan for the 2023 FIBA Basketball World Cup. However, Indonesia needs a suitable venue with a seating capacity of at least 8,000 to meet FIBA standards. Existing venues include the Istora Senayan within the Gelora Bung Karno Sports Complex with up to 7,200 people and The BritAma Arena which can sit only 5,000 people. The government decided to construct a new indoor arena for the world cup instead.

In a meeting between Indonesian Basketball Association (PERBASI) chairman Danny Kosasih and President Joko Widodo, the latter promised to build a new basketball venue for the world cup while the former requested the new venue to have a capacity of around 15,000 to 20,000 seats.

Construction for the then-unnamed venue began in December 2021. The site of the new venue is on a land previously occupied by a helicopter pad at the Gelora Bung Karno Sports Complex.

The Ministry of Youth and Sports announced in July 2022, that the indoor arena would be named "Indonesia Arena".

Facilities
The Indonesia Arena is a multipurpose indoor arena which can be used for various indoor sports, such as basketball, badminton and volleyball, as well as non-sports activities such as concerts. It has a maximum seating capacity of 16,500 which can be reduced temporarily if needed.

References

Indoor arenas under construction
Indoor arenas in Indonesia
Basketball venues in Indonesia
Boxing venues in Indonesia
Gymnastics venues in Indonesia
Volleyball venues in Indonesia
Sports venues in Jakarta
Badminton venues in Jakarta
Basketball venues in Jakarta
Boxing venues in Jakarta
Gymnastics venues in Jakarta
Volleyball venues in Jakarta